Josep Tarradellas Barcelona–El Prat Airport  (Catalan: Aeroport Josep Tarradellas Barcelona-El Prat, Spanish: Aeropuerto Josep Tarradellas Barcelona-El Prat), and also known as El Prat Airport, is an international airport located  southwest of the centre of Barcelona, lying in the municipalities of El Prat de Llobregat, Viladecans, and Sant Boi, in Catalonia, Spain.

It is the second largest and second busiest airport in Spain, and the sixth busiest in Europe. In 2019, Barcelona Airport handled a record 52,686,314 million passengers, up 5.0% from 2018. It is a hub for Level and Vueling, and a focus city for Air Europa, Iberia, EasyJet and Ryanair.

The Barcelona–Madrid air shuttle service, known as "Pont Aeri" (in Catalan) or "Puente Aéreo" (in Spanish), literally "Air Bridge", was the world's busiest route until 2008, with the highest number of flight operations (971 per week) in 2007. The schedule has been reduced since February 2008, when a Madrid–Barcelona high-speed rail line was opened, covering the distance in 2 hours 30 minutes, and quickly became popular.

History

Barcelona's first airfield, located at El Remolar, began operations in 1916. However, it did not have good expansion prospects, so a new airport at El Prat opened in 1918. The first plane was a Latécoère Salmson 300 which arrived from Toulouse with final destination Casablanca. The airport was used as headquarters of the Aeroclub of Catalonia and the base for the Spanish Navy's Zeppelin fleet. Scheduled commercial service began in 1927 with an Iberia service to Madrid Cuatro Vientos Airport. This was Iberia's first route. During the time of the Second Spanish Republic El Prat was one of the bases of LAPE (Líneas Aéreas Postales Españolas).

In 1948, a runway was built (now called runway 07-25); in the same year the first overseas service was operated by Pan American World Airways to New York City, using a Lockheed Constellation. Between 1948 and 1952, a second runway was constructed (runway 16–34), perpendicular to the previous, also taxiways were constructed and a terminal to accommodate passengers. In 1963, the airport reached one million passengers a year. A new control tower was built in 1965. In 1968, a new terminal was opened, which still exists and is in use as what is now Terminal 2B.

On 3 August 1970, Pan American World Airways inaugurated regular service between Barcelona, Lisbon and New York, operated by a Boeing 747.  On 4 November of the same year, Iberia began the "Air-shuttle" service between Barcelona and Madrid–Barajas. A few years later, in 1976, a terminal was built specifically for Iberia's air-shuttle service and a terminal exclusively for cargo, an annexed mail service and an aircraft ramp for air cargo. In 1977, the airport handled over 5 million passengers annually. 

From the late seventies to the early nineties, the airport was stalled in traffic and investments until the 1992 Summer Olympics held in Barcelona. El Prat underwent a major development consisting of the modernization and expansion of the existing terminal, which became known as Terminal B, and the construction of two further terminals flanking that, known as Terminals A and C respectively.

The new Terminal 1 was inaugurated on 16 June 2009, covering . 70% of today's flights operate from Terminal 1. The old Terminals A, B and C are now known as Terminals 2A, 2B and 2C.

Due to the strong drop in air traffic after 1999 and the crisis in the aviation sector in 2001 many charter operations from Girona and Reus were diverted to El Prat, which helped the airport to survive the crisis.

On 1 February 2014, Barcelona–El Prat was the first Spanish airport to receive a daily flight with the Airbus A380-800, on the Emirates route to Dubai International Airport. Emirates also offers a second daily flight, also operated by the A380-800.

International Airlines Group (IAG) announced in December 2016 flights from Barcelona to the US, Latin America and Asia for the summer of 2017. IAG, formed by British Airways, Iberia, Vueling and Aer Lingus, created Level, the second airline, after Norwegian, launching low-cost long haul flights from the Catalan city. They announced flights from June 2017 to Los Angeles, Oakland, Punta Cana and Buenos Aires.

On 14 October 2019, the airport was the first target of protesters after the sentencing of the trial of Catalonia independence leaders. In the morning, called upon by Democratic Tsunami thousands flocked all the accesses and concourses disrupting normal operations. Catalan Police ordered the closing of all transportation services (bus, Metro and Rail) to avoid further arrivals of demonstrators. The blockade of the main access road (C-32 highway) with people walking between the terminals and city center made Taxi and other services unavailable. Deployment of riot police from Civil Guard, National Police and Mossos d'Esquadra to evict protesters lead to massive confrontations leaving dozens injured. Using social media the organizers called off the action by night time but disruption continued. More than a hundred flights were cancelled during the 14th of October and twenty more were announced for the next day by the main operator, Vueling.

Operations
Most of the traffic at Barcelona Airport is domestic and European, in which Vueling has an operational base. Intercontinental connections have not generated a significant amount of passenger traffic during the last years. In the early twenty-first century the airport passenger carried numbers and the number of operations increased significantly.

Low-cost airline traffic grew significantly, especially after the creation of operating bases by Vueling and Clickair at the airport. Vueling and Clickair merged in July 2009, operating under the Vueling name. Other low-cost airlines operate from the airport, including Ryanair, EasyJet, Norwegian Air International, EasyJet Switzerland, Wizz Air and Transavia. A new base was established at the airport in September 2010.

The airport has 3 runways, two parallel, nominated 06L/24R and 06R/24L (the later opened in 2004), and a cross runway 02/20. There are two terminals: T2, which is the sum of the previous Terminals A, B and C, located on the north side of the airport and T1, on the west side, which opened on 16 June 2009.  the two terminals had a combined total of 268 check-in counters and 64 boarding gates. Operations at the airport are restricted exclusively to Instrument flight rules (IFR) flights, except for sanitary, emergency and government VFR flights.

A plan for expansion (Plan Barcelona) was completed in 2009, adding a third terminal building (also designed by Ricardo Bofill) and control tower. An additional runway (07R/25L) was also built. The airport became capable of handling 55 million passengers annually (up from 33 million in 2007). Further expansion was planned to be finished by 2012, with a new satellite terminal to raise capacity to 70 million passengers annually, this is better explained in Terminal T1 section.

The airport is the subject of a political discussion over management and control between the Generalitat of Catalonia and the Spanish Government, which has involved AENA (airport manager) and various airlines, Iberia and Spanair mainly. Part of the controversy is about the benefits that the airport generates, which are used in maintenance and investments in other airports in the network of AENA and government investments in other economic areas.

Terminals

Terminal 1

A new Terminal 1, designed by Ricardo Bofill Taller de Arquitectura was inaugurated on 16 June 2009. This terminal is also capable of handling large aircraft like the Airbus A380-800 or Boeing 747-8I.

The terminal handles both Schengen and non-Schengen flights. It is split into 5 Modules with Module A handling flights to Madrid, Module B handling Schengen flights, Module C handling Air Nostrum flights, Module D handling non-Schengen European flights and Module E handling non-Schengen non-European flights.

Its facilities include:
 258 check-in counters
 60 jetways (some are prepared for the A380, with double jetway)
 15 baggage carousels (one new carousel is equivalent to four carousels in the old terminal)
 12,000 parking spaces, in addition to the 12,000 already in terminal 2

The forecast is that the airport will be able to handle 55 million passengers annually —as opposed to the 30 million people before its construction— and will reach 90 operations an hour.

The extension of the airport with a total investment of €5.1 billion in the future will include a new satellite terminal and refurbishment of existing terminals. The civil engineering phase of the South Terminal had a budget of €1 billion.

It is also planned the construction of a satellite terminal —T1S or Terminal 1 Satèl·lit, in Catalan— considering that the airport is on the verge of overcrowding because terminals cannot handle all passengers because of space shortage. This terminal will be at 1,5 kilometres from the current T1 terminal, behind the 02-20,  transversal, runway. With this action, the airport will be able to increase its passenger capacity to 70 million people annually.

There are two lounges located in Terminal 1.

Terminal 2
Terminal 2 is divided into three linked sections, known as Terminal 2A, 2B and 2C. Terminal 2B is the oldest part of the complex still in use, dating back to 1968. Terminals 2A and 2C were added in order to expand the airport capacity before the arrival of the 1992 Summer Olympics held in the city. This expansion was also designed by Ricardo Bofill.

This terminal is mostly occupied by low-cost airlines, although there are some full-service airlines which also use this terminal.

Following the opening of Terminal 1 in 2009, Terminal 2 became almost empty until the airport authorities lowered landing fees to attract low-cost and regional carriers to fill the terminal. Whilst this has helped, the complex is nowhere near full capacity and Terminal 2A is currently unused for departures. Terminal 2C is used only by EasyJet and EasyJet Switzerland flights, with flights to the UK using module M0, whilst flights to the rest of Europe use module M1. Terminal 2B is mostly used by Ryanair and others, like Transavia. And T2A is adapted for large airplanes, such as B777. The terminal is also split into Modules, where flights to Schengen destinations use Module U and flights to non Schengen destinations use Modules W and Y.

Airlines and destinations
The following airlines operate regular scheduled flights to and from Barcelona:

Statistics

Largest airlines

Busiest routes

Passenger numbers

Ground transportation

Rail
Train
Terminal 2 has its own Rodalies Barcelona commuter train station on the line R2, which runs from the Maçanet-Massanes station every 30 minutes, with major stops at Barcelona Sants railway station and the fairly central Passeig de Gràcia railway station to provide transfer to the Barcelona Metro system, also in Clot station. Passengers for T1 must take a connecting bus from Terminal 2B to Terminal 1. As part of the major expansion above, a new shuttle train is going to be built from Terminal 1 to Barcelona Sants (connected with the high speed train, the AVE) and Passeig de Gràcia Stations was expected by the end of 2020.

Metro
Also this airport is linked to Barcelona by underground (metro) since 12 February 2016 by Line 9 of the Barcelona Metro with a station in each terminal, the Aeroport T1 station situated directly underneath the airport terminal T1 and the Aeroport T2 station close to the Aeroport rail station at the terminal T2. The line connects with several Barcelona Metro lines to the city center.

Road
The C-32B highway connects the airport to a main traffic interchange between Barcelona's Ronda de Dalt beltway and major motorways. There is provision for parking cars at the airport, with about 24,000 parking spaces.

Bus
The Transports Metropolitans de Barcelona (TMB) public bus line 46 runs from Paral·lel Avenue. The Aerobús offers direct transfers from T1 and T2 to the city center at Plaça Catalunya. Another company offers transfers from Barcelona Airport to nearest airports like Reus Airport or Girona–Costa Brava, provincial and national capitals and links with France or Andorra.

Incidents and accidents

 On 21 October 1994, a Falcon 20 cargo aircraft made an emergency landing at the airport after suffering a malfunction in its landing gear; none of the three crewmembers were injured.
 On 19 February 1998, two people, the commander and the pilot died in an Ibertrans general aviation plane crash in the borough of Gavà shortly after taking off from El Prat.
 On 28 July 1998, a general aviation cargo plane carrying press from Mallorca crashed next to one of the fences surrounding the airport, killing two crew members and the co-pilot.

See also
 List of works by Ricardo Bofill Taller de Arquitectura

Notes

External links

Official website

Airports in Catalonia
Ricardo Bofill buildings
Buildings and structures in Baix Llobregat
Airport
Transport in El Prat de Llobregat
Airports established in 1918
1918 establishments in Spain